Gravida (organization) (Gravida: National Centre for Growth and Development) is a New Zealand government-funded Centre of Research Excellence 
 La donna gravida, an oil portrait by Raphael
 Lasiothyris gravida, a species of moth
 Pareuxoa gravida, a species of moth
 Bathymophila gravida, a species of sea snail
 Cribrarula gravida, a species of sea snail
 Odostomia gravida, a species of sea snail

See also
 Gravidity and parity